Big Blue Marble is a half-hour children's television program that was aired from 1974 to 1983 in syndication including on PBS television stations.

Overview 
Distinctive content included stories about children around the world and a pen-pal club that encouraged intercultural communication. The name of the show referred to the appearance of Earth as a giant marble, popularized by The Blue Marble, a famous photograph taken in December 1972 by the crew of Apollo 17.

Each episode featured a segment about the real life of a boy and a girl, one American, the other foreign. The show also had occasional stories about world ecology. In addition there was a weekly segment in which a singing globe "Bluey" invited viewers to write letters to the show, often requests for pen pals. The address to send the letters was in Santa Barbara, California. The character was voiced by executive producer Robert Wiemer.

Production 
The program was funded by ITT. Production personnel included creators Ken Snyder, Henry Fownes, and Robert Garrison, and later executive producer Robert Weimer, producer Rick Berman (who later became producer for the Star Trek series), writers Lynn Rogoff and directors Joe Napolitano, Joseph Consentino, Tom Hurwitz, John McDonald, J.J. Linsalata, Pat Saunders, and Ira Wohl. Robert Saidenberg was supervising producer, Peter Hammer supervising film editor and Dale Glickman post-production supervisor of the series late in its run. Paul Baillargeon composed much of the series' music and recruited Wiemer's youngest daughter Whitney Kershaw to sing "Get Closer", the closing theme for the second half of the series' run.

Weimer often rewarded staff members with the opportunity to pitch story ideas and direct segments of the series. As a result, many got their first chance to work in that capacity. Some children featured on the show who went on to high-profile careers include Tisha Campbell (actress/singer), France Joli (Canadian disco singer) and Kevin Clash (prominent Muppet performer of Elmo on Sesame Street). Before they were well known, actors Sarah Jessica Parker and Kelly Reno were featured in dramatic segments in the series.

Each of the first 78 half-hour episodes produced during the original three years of production contained animated pieces sequences by Ron Campbell Films, Inc., executive produced and directed by Ron Campbell, written by Cliff Roberts.

In 1974, A&M Records released an album of songs from the show, also titled Big Blue Marble (catalog no. SP-3401).

Broadcast 
Big Blue Marble was syndicated to television stations throughout the United States and Canada. C/F International was the most recent rights holder to the series; that company folded in 2008.

Awards
 Peabody Award (1975)
 Emmy Awards (multiple)

References

External links
 
 C/F International: Big Blue Marble 
 Big Blue Marble episode guide courtesy of C/F International
 "The Earth's a Big Blue Marble"

1970s American children's television series
1980s American children's television series
First-run syndicated television programs in the United States
1974 American television series debuts
1983 American television series endings
Emmy Award-winning programs
Peabody Award-winning television programs
American children's education television series
ITT Inc.